Tarodes is a monotypic genus of  jumping spiders containing the single species, Tarodes lineatus. It was first described by Reginald Innes Pocock in 1899, and is found only on the Bismarck Archipelago of New Britain. The species name lineatus means "striped" in Latin.

References

External links
 Diagnostic drawings of T. lineatus
 Photographs of T. lineatus (?) from Solomon Islands

Monotypic Salticidae genera
Salticidae
Spiders of Oceania
Taxa named by R. I. Pocock